The Policía de la Provincia de Tucumán (Tucumán Province Police; PPT) is an Argentine police agency, responsible for policing the Tucumán province.

See also
Argentine Federal Police
Buenos Aires Police
Buenos Aires Urban Guard
Santa Fe Province Police
Interior Security System

External links
 Official website

Provincial law enforcement agencies of Argentina